Polemon christyi, also known commonly as Christy's snake-eater and the eastern snake-eater, is a species of venomous rear-fanged snake in the subfamily Aparallactinae of the family Atractaspididae. The species is native to Central Africa and East Africa.

Etymology
The specific name, christyi, is in honor of English physician Cuthbert Christy, who presented the type specimen to the British Museum (Natural History).

Geographic range
Distribution of Polemon christyi include Uganda, the Democratic Republic of the Congo,  South Sudan, and western Kenya. The status of observations from Rwanda and Malawi is uncertain, whereas observations from Tanzania, Zambia, and possibly Burundi likely refer to Polemon ater described in 2019.

Habitat

Description
The dorsum of the body of P. christyi is black. The ventral surface of the head is also black. The ventrals and subcaudals are white, broadly margined with black.

The dorsal scales are smooth, without apical pits, and are arranged in 15 rows at midbody. The ventrals number 209. The anal plate is divided. The subcaudals number 20, also divided.

The diameter of the eye is three fifths its distance from the mouth. The rostral is higher than wide, barely visible from above. The internasals are slightly shorter than the prefrontals. The frontal is slightly longer than broad, much broader than the supraoculars, as long as its distance from the rostral, much shorter than the parietals. The nasal is entire, in contact with the preocular. There are two postoculars. The temporals are 1+1. There are seven upper labials, the third and fourth entering the eye. There are four lower labials in contact with the anterior chin shield, the first lower labial forming a suture with its fellow behind the mental. There are two pairs of chin shields, the anterior pair larger than the posterior pair.

Diet
P. christyi preys upon snakes, including those of its own species.

Reproduction
P. christyi is oviparous.

References

Further reading
Spawls S, Howell K, Hinkel H, Menegon M (2018). Field Guide to East African Reptiles, Second Edition. London: Bloomsbury Natural History. 624 pp. . (Polemon christyi, p. 461).
Tilbury, Colin, Branch, Bill (2014). "Polemon christyi (Boulenger, 1903) Christy's Snake-eater". African Herp News (61): 36–38.

Atractaspididae
Snakes of Africa
Reptiles of the Democratic Republic of the Congo
Reptiles of Kenya
Reptiles of South Sudan
Reptiles of Uganda
Reptiles described in 1903
Taxa named by George Albert Boulenger